Wini Wini (Aymara wini a very heavy and hard stone used to work others, the reduplication indicates that there is a group or a complex of something, Hispanicized spelling Huini Huini) is a mountain in the Andes of Peru, about  high. It is situated in the Puno Region, Lampa Province, Ocuviri District.

References

Mountains of Puno Region
Mountains of Peru